Melaka virus (MELV) is a bat-borne virus. It was first isolated in a human in Melaka, Malaysia in 2006. A bat reservoir was suspected because traceback analysis revealed that the patient had been exposed to a bat prior to the onset of infection. Melaka virus causes a non-fatal respiratory tract illness in humans.

Virology 
Melaka virus is a nonenveloped, segmented, double-stranded RNA virus. Having a segmented genome facilitates reassortment. Melaka is a fusogenic virus which enhances virulence in its ability to carry out cell-cell fusion.

Transmission 
Transmission is believed to be human to human through droplet respiration. The patient was the sole member of his family to be exposed to the bat, yet three members of his family became ill with the virus.

See also 
 Orphan virus
 Xi River virus
 Cell-cell fusogens

References

External links
 MicrobiologyBytes - Reoviruses
 Viralzone: Orthoreovirus

Viral diseases
Bat virome
Reoviruses
Zoonoses